Pitch and putt is an amateur sport very similar to, and derived from, golf, where the hole length is typically up to  and just 2–3 clubs are typically used. The game was organised and developed in Ireland during the early 20th century, before expanding through the 1940s, and is now played in dozens of countries. The international governing bodies of the sport include the Federation of International Pitch and Putt Associations (FIPPA) and the International Pitch and Putt Association (IPPA).

History 
While a similar short par 3 course was opened in 1914 in Portsmouth, England (then known as "miniature golf"), the website of the Federation of International Pitch and Putt Associations suggests that the organised game of pitch and putt began in County Cork, Ireland in the late 1920s, before being developed through the 1940s and then spreading internationally.

A European governing body was formed in 1999-2000, and then a first global governing body by 17 countries in 2006, and then in 2009, four countries separated and formed a second world body with two other countries. The first governing body, the Federation of International Pitch and Putt Associations (FIPPA), with the European Pitch and Putt Association (EPPA), sees Pitch and Putt as a separate sport drawing on golf, and maintains cordial relations with golfing bodies, but does not adopt their rules wholesale. The other governing body, the IPPA, sees Pitch and Putt as a "golf speciality", and uses the Rules of Golf, with two major variations, and a focus on shorter distances between holes.

Game play
The original rules developed in Ireland have been subject to variations as the game has spread, and today each country can devise its own rules.  

The game is played from raised artificial teeing surfaces using a tee and it has its own handicap system.

For international competitions, countries working within the IPPA framework look to the Rules of Golf (which are published by the Royal and Ancient and the USPGA), while those working within the FIPPA / EPPA framework uses those bodies' shared rules, operating autonomously from the golf authorities.

For international competitions:
 players may only use three clubs, one of which must be a putter.

International associations 

In additional to national associations, the game has been organized internationally by the European Pitch and Putt Association (EPPA) since 1999, by the Federation of International Pitch and Putt Associations (FIPPA) since 2006 and by the International Pitch and Putt Association (IPPA) since 2009.

The European Pitch and Putt Association (EPPA) was founded at a meeting in Dublin in 1999 by representatives from Ireland, Great Britain, Spain, France, the Netherlands and Italy. Later, Norway, Switzerland, San Marino, Denmark, Andorra and Germany joined the EPPA. The European Pitch and Putt Association stages a biennial European Team Championship.

The Federation of International Pitch and Putt Associations (FIPPA) was created in March 2006 in a meeting in Barcelona by representatives of 17 pitch and putt associations. FIPPA's original members included Ireland, Spain, Norway, Great Britain, Switzerland, Australia, Chile, Andorra, and the United States. Canada, China, and Germany were associate members. The Federation of International Pitch and Putt Associations stages a biennial Pitch and Putt World Cup and, since 2009, the Pitch and putt World Strokeplay Championship.

The International Pitch and Putt Association (IPPA) was formed in 2009, when France, Italy, San Marino, and Denmark voted to leave FIPPA and EPPA and found a new organisation, together with Spain and Portugal.

References

External links 
 Federation of International Pitch and Putt Associations website
 International Pitch and Putt Association website
 European Pitch and Putt Association (archived 2009)

Ball games
Forms of golf
Individual sports
Sports originating in Ireland
 
Precision sports